Haiyang, a coastal city in Shandong province in eastern China, located on the Yellow Sea (southern) coast of the Shandong Peninsula. It is a county-level city under the administration of the prefecture-level city of Yantai.

Haiyang's claim to fame comes from its extensive sea beaches, national forest parks, wetland reserves, as well as its beautiful beach and yachting opportunities. On 2 December 2006 the Olympic Council of Asia in Doha announced the selection of Haiyang as the host city for the 2012 Asian Beach Games. Haiyang is the site of the new Haiyang Nuclear Power Plant. Haiyang is the hometown of writer Sun Junqing, whose 1962 work about the hope for a better year of farming in 1963 after the Great Chinese Famine is part of the Putonghua Proficiency Test.

Geography

Administrative Divisions

As of 2012, Haiyang administers four subdistricts and 9 towns:

Climate

History

Historical affiliation
Haiyang was first settled with Laiyi people, one of peripheral Chinese ethnic minorities, some 2,300 years ago, and was annexed into China proper over centuries of dynasty rule and wars. Haiyang was consecutively under administration of Qi Kingdom in Warring Period, Jiaodong Province in Qin Dynasty, Laizhou Prefecture in Tang, Song and Yuan Dynasties and Dengzhou Prefecture in Ming Dynasty.

Dasongwei Fortress
In 1389, Dasongwei Fortress, one of the nine coastal Fortresses of the time to guard against Japanese invasion and pirate attacks, was set up to govern both administratively and militarily the today's area of Haiyang, which land was ever called Dansylvania in the 19th century. In 1734, Dasongwei Fortress is officially renamed as Haiyang, which name lasts to date covering the south coast of Shandong Peninsula with an area of more than 3,000 kilometers. In 1947, the newly founded communist government cut off the eastern land of Haiyang to create another county of Rushan, since then Haiyang's 1,886 kilometer area forms a shape of flying phoenix towards west Pacific Ocean.

European settlement
From the late 19th century until World War I, Haiyang was a strategic town on the route between the two European settlements of Tsingtao and Weihaiwei, respectively taken by Germany in 1898 and Britain in 1898 on lease basis, and commercial and trade activities were active until 1947 when communist troops took over.

Economy

Haiyang Port
Haiyang Port is one of the pivotal ports along south coastline of Shandong Peninsula with sea route connecting Korea, Japan and south Chinese ports. In May 1860, French navy tried to land for taking the fortress and failed. In August 1947, the government troops retreated from the port for Tsingtao after defeat by the communists. In April 1963, the Taiwan-based Chinese nationalist troops tried to land for taking back the city and all were defeated and captured by the paramilitaries. Haiyang Port is today one of the trade ports for the peninsula province with active export-oriented manufactures, and administratively under Qingdao Customs and Port authorities.

Clean energy transition 
Due to natural gas shortages, the Chinese government implemented a 5-year plan in 2017 to convert half of northern China to clean energy for winter heating. By the end of 2019 the Haiyang Nuclear Power Plant provided heating to 700,000 square meters of housing via non-radioactive steam, with the entire city expected to follow by 2021. This is anticipated to save 23,200 tons of coal each year, and more than 60,000 tons of fossil fuel emissions.

Tourism

Vacation facilities
Haiyang is nicknamed West Pacific Paradise partially due to its literal meaning of the city name, which means Ocean and Sun. With Laoshan mountain range in the northwest and Kunyu maintain range in the northeast, Haiyang boasts the nationwide best facilities of beach sporting and leisure resorts, including but not limited to Tiger Beach Golf Courses, Yachting Clubs, sailing events, Sand Carving Parks, Beach Volleyball Club, Beach Basketball Club, Music Festival, Japanese Village, seaview gardens and terrains, Phoenix Wetland Reserve, National Forest Park and Coast Film Park. Rocky Islands some 80 kilometers off the shore are another vacation resort of the city.

Leisure resorts
The city, known for its newly discovered primitive beauty, is a prime destination for beach sports with its 230 kilometer coastline, and climatically and typographically is quite similar to Scotland. In the past decade, this city has quickly become one of the top summer resorts and vacation paradises in China, and in northeast Asia in general.

Asian Beach Games
Haiyang hosted the 2012 Asian Beach Games, the first ever to be held in China, which was announced by the Olympic Council of Asia in Doha on 2 December 2006.

References

External links
 Haiyang Government website, English version

 
Cities in Shandong
Yantai